The Technical Grammy Award is a  Special Merit Grammy Award presented to individuals or companies who have made contributions of outstanding technical significance to the recording field.  The award was first presented in 1994 to Dr. Thomas G. Stockham Jr.  Others who have received this award include Ray Dolby, Ikutaro Kakehashi, Rupert Neve, Les Paul, Phil Ramone, Dr. Robert Moog, Geoff Emerick, Tom Dowd, Bill Putnam, George Massenburg, Roger Linn, Leo Fender and Thomas Alva Edison.  Companies honored include AKG, Apple Computer, Digidesign, JBL Professional, Lexicon, Shure Incorporated, and Sony/Philips.

References

Grammy Awards